NGC 3054 is an intermediate spiral galaxy in the constellation Hydra. It was discovered by Christian Heinrich Friedrich Peters in 1859.  It is probably in the same galaxy group as NGC 2935.

In January 2006, the supernova SN 2006T was observed in NGC 3054. In February 2022, the SN 2022crv supernova was discovered by the Distance Less Than 40 Mpc (DLT40) survey and was detected with the Australia Telescope Compact Array .

See also
 NGC 1300

References

External links
 
 SIMBAD: NGC 3054 -- Galaxy
 Some pretty pictures!
 

Intermediate spiral galaxies
Hydra (constellation)
3054
28571